Mauritania is divided into 12 wilayahss (wilayahs) called wilayah and one capital district in Nouakchott, which in turn are subdivided into 44 mouaghataas of Mauritania mouaghataas (departement). 

There are 216 communes of Mauritania.

The regions and capital district (in alphabetical order) and their capitals are:

 
Mauritania
Mauritania